Delawanna is a commuter rail station for New Jersey Transit in the Delawanna section of Clifton, Passaic County, New Jersey. The station, located at the intersection of Delawanna Avenue (Passaic County Route 610) and Oak Street (County Route 605), serves trains on New Jersey Transit's Main Line, serving Hoboken Terminal on the east end and Suffern and Port Jervis stations on the west end in New York. Delawanna station has two low-level side platforms with a shelter on the inbound side, lacking access for the physically disabled under the Americans With Disabilities Act of 1990.

History 
Service to Delawanna, a portmanteau of Delaware and Lackawanna, began on September 12, 1870, for Delaware, Lackawanna and Western Railroad's Boonton Branch for freights. Passenger service began on December 14, 1870. The station depot was replaced in 1925 on the westbound side when the tracks were elevated through Clifton. That structure came down on May 14, 1970, after years of neglect.

Station layout
The station has two tracks, each with a low-level side platform. A large parking lot is available on Delawanna Avenue for riders.

Bibliography

References

External links

 Delawanna Avenue entrance from Google Maps Street View

Clifton, New Jersey
NJ Transit Rail Operations stations
Railway stations in the United States opened in 1870
Railway stations in Passaic County, New Jersey
Former Delaware, Lackawanna and Western Railroad stations
1870 establishments in New Jersey